Elena Žalinkevičaitė-Petrauskienė (September 23, 1900 – May 23, 1986) was a Lithuanian actress and writer. She was also the Lithuanian tenor Kipras Petrauskas's wife. In 1942, her husband was asked to hide a Jewish baby girl, Dana Pomeranz, which she and he agreed to. To hide the girl better, Elena and her husband left the city, moving first to a Lithuanian village, and later to Austria and then Germany. In 1947 they came back to Lithuania, and they found Dana's parents and gave her back to them.

In 1999 Elena and her husband were recognized by Yad Vashem as two of the Righteous Among the Nations.

References

1900 births
1986 deaths
Lithuanian stage actresses
Lithuanian Righteous Among the Nations
20th-century Lithuanian actresses
Burials at Rasos Cemetery